Ellen Damgaard Andersen is a physician and researcher who described Andersen Syndrome. This autosomal, dominant trait and the syndrome was described as a condition where ventricular arrhythmia, with an accompanying a variant of long QT interval, periodic paralysis and distinctive physical characteristics.

References

Danish women physicians
Living people
1939 births